The economy of Northern Ireland is the smallest of the four constituents of the United Kingdom and the smaller of the two jurisdictions on the island of Ireland. At the time of the Partition of Ireland in 1922, and for a period afterwards, Northern Ireland had a predominantly industrial economy, most notably in shipbuilding, rope manufacture and textiles, but most heavy industry has since been replaced by services. Northern Ireland's economy has strong links to the economies of the Republic of Ireland and Great Britain.

Overview

Output and economic growth
Northern Ireland has the smallest economy of any of the twelve ITL 1 regions of the United Kingdom, at £27.4bn (€37.8bn). However, this is partly because Northern Ireland has the smallest population; at £15,200 (€21,000) Northern Ireland has a greater GDP per capita than both North East England and Wales.

Rural areas including the North West are particularly deprived. It suffers from the highest unemployment and highest poverty rates in Northern Ireland.

Throughout the 1990s, the Northern Irish economy grew faster than the rest of the UK, due in part to the rapid growth of the economy of the Republic of Ireland and the so-called "peace dividend". An April 2007 survey found Northern Ireland's average house price to be one of the highest in the UK, behind London, the South East, and the South West. It also found Northern Ireland to have all of the top ten property "hot spots", with the Craigavon and Newtownards areas increasing by 55%. However, as of 2018 Northern Ireland house prices are the lowest on average in the UK, approximately 40% lower than before the bubble burst in 2008.

Employment
Unemployment in Northern Ireland has fallen substantially in recent years, and is now roughly at 6.1%, down from a peak of 17.2% in 1986. Youth unemployment and long-term unemployment have fallen most quickly.  Working-age economic inactivity is 28%, which is the highest of any UK region.

Northern Ireland's macroeconomy is also characterised by considerably longer actual working hours and lower gender income disparity than in the United Kingdom as a whole.

Investment
Foreign direct investment was restrained by The Troubles. Since the signing of the Good Friday Agreement, investment in Northern Ireland has increased significantly. Most investment has been focused in Greater Belfast and to a lesser extent Greater Derry. Major projects include the Victoria Square Shopping Centre Belfast City Centre. Titanic Quarter is a waterfront development under construction. The Laganside Corporation was previously at the forefront of the redevelopment along the banks of the River Lagan. The Cathedral Quarter has also seen substantial investment. In Derry, the ILEX Urban Regeneration Company no longer exists. The area is 12th in terms of funding despite it being the second city.

Agriculture

Agriculture in Northern Ireland is heavily mechanised.  In 2000, agriculture accounted for 2.4% of economic output in Northern Ireland, compared to 1% in the United Kingdom as a whole. As in the rest of the United Kingdom, livestock and dairy account for the majority of agricultural output.  The main crops are potatoes, barley, and wheat.

Manufacturing

Machinery and equipment manufacturing, food processing, textile and electronics manufacturing are the leading industries. Other industries such as papermaking, furniture manufacturing, aerospace and shipbuilding are also important, concentrated mostly in the eastern parts of Northern Ireland.

Northern Ireland experienced a period of steep manufacturing growth between 1998 and 2001.

Engineering is the largest manufacturing sub-sector in Northern Ireland, particularly in the fields of aerospace and heavy machinery. Major employers are Moy Park, Spirit Aerosystems, Caterpillar and Seagate.

Harland and Wolff, which in the early 20th century was the world's biggest shipbuilder, suffered from intense international competition during the 1970s and 1980s and declined rapidly. During the 1990s the company diversified into civil engineering and industrial fabrication, manufacturing bridges and oil platforms. The vast works on Queen's Island were downsized, with much of the land (including the slipway where RMS Titanic was built) sold off for redevelopment in the 2000s as the Titanic Quarter.  H&W has not built a ship since 2003, but has seen workload increase through shipbreaking, ship repair and maintenance and conversion work. The company has also been active in the design and construction of offshore power generation equipment- both wind turbines and wave-action turbines.

Services
Services account for almost 70% of economic output, and 78% of employees.

Effects of the COVID-19 pandemic 
The economy of Northern Ireland was negatively impacted by the lockdowns and travel restrictions necessitated by the COVID-19 pandemic. The tourism and hospitality industry was particularly hard hit. These sectors "have been mandated to close since 26 December 2020, with a very limited number of exceptions" and many restrictions were continuing into April 2021. Hotels and other accommodations, for example, "closed apart from only for work-related stays". Restaurants and pubs were restricted to take-away service. In February, the government said it would not consider "reopening hospitality before mid-summer".

In late March, owners and operators of many types of businesses signed a petition "calling for the economy to reopen" and requested a "proper timetable plan" for rebuilding the economy. The content also discussed the "catastrophe" that the lockdowns and restrictions had created. Government assistance was available; the £25,000 Retail, Hospitality, Tourism and Leisure Grant was closed by 25 March 2021 but "a further payment" was to be made to eligible businesses.

Some restrictions were expected to be loosened in mid April but tourism was expected to remain very limited. Anyone entering NI and planning to stay for a day or longer was required to "self-isolate for 10 days"; this did not apply to those on "essential" trips. Everyone entering NI was required to provide evidence of a negative Covid-19 test.

Public sector

As of December 2008 the public sector in Northern Ireland accounted for 30.8% of the total workforce; this is significantly higher than the overall UK figure. Overall, the figure for Northern Ireland has fallen. In 1992 the public sector accounted for 37% of the workforce.

In total in 2006, the British government subvention totalled £5,000m, or 20% of Northern Ireland's economic output. This had risen to £11,547m in 2009–10 during the "Great Recession", and then fell back to £9,160m in 2013–14. A 2017 article by a research professor at the Economic and Social Research Institute quantified the transfers at 10.8 billion Euro annually. In late 2018 The Irish Times estimated that the subvention had risen to £10.8 billion, about a quarter of Northern Ireland's GDP.

Currency

The official currency in use in Northern Ireland is the British pound sterling. The euro, in use in the Republic of Ireland, is also accepted by some retailers.

Four Northern Irish banks print their own sterling-denominated banknotes: Bank of Ireland, First Trust Bank, Northern Bank, and Ulster Bank. The central bank of the UK is the Bank of England.

Energy

Energy policy in the province is set by the Department for the Economy.

Electricity
Northern Ireland's electrical grid is operated by System Operator for Northern Ireland (SONI) and the distribution is managed by Northern Ireland Electricity (NIE) which owns and manages the infrastructure which connects over 850,000 customers.  Electricity consumption in Northern Ireland was 7,867 GW·h in 2002/3. At 4.6 MW·h per person, this is 18% less than that of the rest of the United Kingdom (5.6 MW·h per person). There are three main power stations in Northern Ireland: Ballylumford & Kilroot power stations located in County Antrim and Coolkeeragh power station in County Londonderry. The electricity grid throughout the island of Ireland is operated as a single system, with separate control centers in Dublin and Belfast.

Northern Ireland's electrical grid is connected to that of the Republic of Ireland by three cross-border interconnectors.  The main interconnector, between Tandragee and Louth has a capacity of 1,200 MW.  Two back-up interconnectors have a combined capacity of 240 MW.  This combined all-island grid is connected to the National Grid on Great Britain by the 500 MW Moyle interconnector, under the North Channel.

Gas
Gas for the Greater Belfast area is supplied via the Scotland-Northern Ireland pipeline (SNIP), a  interconnector. SSE Airtricity and firmus energy supply gas to the Greater Belfast area via Phoenix Natural Gas' network.

In the other areas of Northern Ireland, specifically towards Derry City, gas comes from two interconnector pipelines, one being supplied by the Republic's gas supplier, Bord Gáis. The North-West pipeline from Carrickfergus in County Antrim to Derry opened in November 2004, and the south–north pipeline from Gormanston (in the Republic) to Antrim was opened in October 2006. The complete south–north pipeline to Dublin opened in November 2007, passing Armagh, Banbridge, Craigavon and Newry. Since December 2005, Bord Gáis has supplied gas to residential customers in this area under the name firmus energy.

Transport

Northern Ireland has a total of 24,820 km (15,420 mi) of roads, or 1 km for each 68 people (1 mi for each 109 people), which is considerably more than in the United Kingdom as a whole (1 km per 162 people). There are seven motorways in Northern Ireland, extending radially from Belfast, and connecting that city to Antrim, Dungannon, Lisburn, Newtownabbey, and Portadown.

Northern Ireland Railways (NIR) runs passenger trains and presently carries no freight.

Northern Ireland has three civilian airports: Belfast City, Belfast International, and City of Derry. Only Belfast City Airport is served by train, from Sydenham station on the Bangor Line.

Major seaports in Northern Ireland include the Port of Belfast, the Derry Port and the Port of Larne. The Port of Belfast is one of the chief ports of the United Kingdom, handling 17 million tonnes (16.7 million long tons) of goods in 2005

In addition to these existing links, several organisations have proposed a tunnel under the North Channel, with one possible site connecting the eastern part of Northern Ireland to Wigtownshire.  The idea has been given technical consideration since the 19th century.

Data
The Northern Ireland Statistics and Research Agency (NISRA) is the principal source of official statistics on Northern Ireland. These statistics and research inform public policy and associated debate in the wider society. NISRA is an Agency of the Department of Finance and Personnel.

Alongside official national statistics a number of respected private sector surveys are used to understand how the economy is performing. These include the British Chambers of Commerce Quarterly Economic Survey which has information on the performance of Northern Irish businesses since 1989.

Regional Disparity / North-South Divide

According to Eurostat figures, there are huge regional disparities in the UK with GDP per capita ranging from £11,000 (€15,000) in West Wales to £130,450 (€179,800) in Inner-London West. There are 26 areas in the UK where the GDP per person is under £14,500 (€20,000).

1.1 million (60% of Northern Irish) live in these deprived districts; three of these are in Northern Ireland: Outer Belfast, North of Northern Ireland, West & South of Northern Ireland.

See also
 Economy of the Republic of Ireland
 Countries of the United Kingdom by GDP per capita
 Northern Ireland fiscal balance

References

External links
 
 Northern Ireland Executive departments responsible for economic policy:
 Department for the Economy - oversees Invest Northern Ireland and Tourism Northern Ireland
 Department of Finance
 Department for Infrastructure
 Department of Agriculture, Environment and Rural Affairs